Senator Yager may refer to:

Ken Yager (born 1947), Tennessee State Senate
William Overall Yager (1833–1904), Virginia State Senate